Stanley is a community located in the East Hants municipal district, Hants County, Nova Scotia. Stanley is most famous as the birthplace of the acclaimed Canadian poet Alden Nowlan.

History 
Stanley's first settler was New England planter John Smith, who in 1760 established a village on the banks of the Kennetcook River. He was quickly followed by John Anthony (1761) and James Campbell (1772). After the American Revolution, the area became part of Douglas Township (1784) and was settled by soldiers of the British 84th Regiment. In 1883 the community was renamed for Governor General Stanley, after whom the Stanley Cup of the National Hockey League is also named.

During the Second World War (1939–45), the community became the site of Stanley Airport, which the Royal Canadian Air Force used from March 17, 1941 until January 14, 1944 to train pilots under the British Commonwealth Air Training Plan. Many of the citizens of Stanley assisted the war effort by actively supporting the RCAF in training Commonwealth pilots. Barracks were built for 360 trainees and support staff. The hangar erected to house the aircraft became the largest building in Hants County. Currently, the airport is maintained by the Stanley Sport Aviation group.

Alden Nowlan 

Stanley is the birthplace of renowned writer Alden Nowlan. Nowlan won the Governor General’s Award for poetry, and he is ranked alongside Canada's great poets. Nowlan grew up exposed to violence, alcoholism and poverty in precarious family circumstances. Self-educated for much of his life, he dropped out of school in grade five. He taught himself to read by befriending a librarian at the Library in Windsor, Nova Scotia; a plaque in the Windsor library is dedicated to him.  He graduated as a teenager from a two-week program offered by the Folk School in the Kennetcook Hotel, Kennetcook, Nova Scotia (February 1953). First published at age 19, he went to work for the Hartland, New Brunswick Observer and later for the Saint John Telegraph-Journal.

Population 
According to Statistics Canada, the population of East Hants, the municipality which includes Stanley, was 21,387 in 2006. For 96 percent of the population, the primary language in East Hants is English. The employment rate is 63 percent, and the official unemployment rate is 6.7 percent. The median annual income for males is $34,340 and for females it's $17,381.

Community events 
Stanley holds an annual Pumpkin weigh-off in September. Stanley Sport Aviation holds the Stanley Fly-in, typically on the Canadian Labour Day weekend.

References
Primary Texts
Cook, G.M. (2003). One Heart, One Way. Lawrencetown: Pottersfield Press. (p. 21)

Endnotes

Links
 Stanley on Destination Nova Scotia

Communities in Hants County, Nova Scotia